Harlan Alonso Smith, known as Lonnie Smith (born November 5, 1962 in Denver, Colorado), is an American boxer at Welterweight. He reigned briefly as the WBC world Junior Welterweight champion between 1985 and 1986.

Professional career
Known as "Lightning" Lonnie, Smith turned pro in 1980 and lost once in his first 22 fights, before he had a win over undefeated Billy Costello to capture the WBC Light Welterweight world title in 1985. He lost the title in his first defense to Rene Arredondo via 5th round TKO.

Julio César Chávez fight
In 1991 he took on WBC Light Welterweight Title holder Julio César Chávez, but lost a one-sided decision.

Before their bout, the two had a confrontation at McCarran International Airport when Chavez arrived in Las Vegas. This was recorded by Showtime channel's television camera people and shown to viewers before their actual ring encounter.

Smith never again fought for a title, and retired in 1999 after a loss to Diosbelys Hurtado with a record of 45-6-2.

Professional boxing record

See also
List of world light-welterweight boxing champions

References

External links

 

|-

1962 births
Living people
American male boxers
Boxers from Denver
African-American boxers
World Boxing Council champions
World light-welterweight boxing champions
Welterweight boxers